Vladan Novevski (born 13 May 2002), nicknamed Vlada, is a Serbian professional footballer who plays as a winger for Voždovac.

International career
Novevski's first international experience came at youth level with the North Macedonia under-16, under-17, under-18 and under-19 national teams, but he decided to accept the call-up by Football Association of Serbia. On 6 September 2021, he was named as a member of the Serbia under-20 squad, and debuted a few days later against Italy under-20.

Career statistics

Club

References

External links
 
 

Living people
2002 births
Macedonian footballers
North Macedonia youth international footballers 
Macedonian expatriate footballers
Expatriate footballers in Serbia
Macedonian expatriate sportspeople in Serbia
Association football midfielders 
FK Vojvodina players
Serbian SuperLiga players
Footballers from Novi Sad